Right of way is a legal concept designating allowance of use of a footpath or other route on privately owned land.

Right of way may also refer to:

Right-of-way (transportation) in chiefly American usage, an easement or grant to use the land, in order to construct transportation facilities
Right-of-way (traffic), allowing priority use of a traffic path, to the exclusion of another user
Right of way (shipping), set of sailing rules on water paths regarding priority and signaling
Right of way, priority of attacking in fencing

Popular culture
Right of Way (album), a 2003 album by Ferry Corsten
Right of Way (film), a 1983 television film drama
The Right of Way (1915 film), a lost silent film
The Right of Way (1920 film), an American film starring Bert Lytell
The Right of Way (1931 film), an American film starring Conrad Nagel and Loretta Young

See also
Visual flight rules
Rights of way in England and Wales
Rights of way in Scotland
National broadband plan